The following is a compilation of notable records and statistics for teams and players in the National Women's Soccer League, which started in 2013.

Statistics for the NWSL Challenge Cup, a competition originally created in place of the 2020 season that was cancelled due to the COVID-19 pandemic, are treated separately from regular season statistics.

Champions and shield winners

By season

Total trophies by team 

Italics indicates a defunct team.

Team records

Wins
 Most wins in a season (24 games): 17, North Carolina Courage (2018) 
 Fewest wins in a season (20 games): 3, Boston Breakers (2016)
 Fewest wins in a season (24 games): 1, Sky Blue FC (2018)
 Most consecutive wins in a season: 7, joint record:
 FC Kansas City (2014)
 Seattle Reign FC (2014)
 Portland Thorns FC (2017)
 Most consecutive games without a win: 23, Sky Blue FC (2018)
 Most consecutive away games without a win: 19, Boston Breakers (between August 6, 2014 and July 10, 2016)
 Most consecutive home wins in a season: 7, joint record:
 Portland Thorns FC (between June 28, 2017 and September 30, 2017)
 North Carolina Courage (between July 5, 2019 and October 12, 2019)
 Most consecutive home wins: 8, Portland Thorns FC (between June 28, 2017 and April 15, 2018)
 Most wins in total (204 games): 99, Portland Thorns FC

Losses 
 Fewest losses in a season (24 games): 1, North Carolina Courage  (2018)
 Longest unbeaten run: 20 games, Washington Spirit (between September 26th, 2021 and May 7th, 2022)
 Most losses in total (204 games): 94, NJ/NY Gotham FC
 Fewest home losses in a season (12 games): 0, Seattle Reign FC (2014)
 Most consecutive losses in a season: 11, NJ/NY Gotham FC (2022)
 Most consecutive home games undefeated: 22, Seattle Reign FC (between April 13, 2014 and August 29, 2015)

Attendance 

1 A semifinal that would have been played in North Carolina was moved to Portland due to Hurricane Florence.
2 Due to restrictions related to the COVID-19 pandemic, many teams had reduced capacities for part or all of the season, including some games with zero fans.

Goals 
 Most goals scored in a season: 54, North Carolina Courage (2019)
 Fewest goals scored in a season: 12, Washington Spirit (2018)
 Most goals conceded in a season: 53, Orlando Pride (2019)
 Fewest goals conceded in a season (joint record): 17, North Carolina Courage (2018), Portland Thorns (2021)
 Best goal difference in a season: 36, North Carolina Courage (2018)
 Most goals scored in total: 283, Portland Thorns FC
 Most goals conceded in total: 279, Sky Blue FC/NJ/NY Gotham FC
 Most consecutive games scoring: 28 games, FC Kansas City (2013–2014) includes 3 playoff games
 Most consecutive games scoring 2+ goals: 7 games, Western New York Flash (2013)
 Longest shutout streak (joint record): 5 games, Seattle Reign FC (2016), North Carolina Courage (2021)

Regular season records
Through 2022 season (Regular season games only)

Sort order is Pts, finishing positions, wins

Playoff records
Through 2022 playoffs

1Draws after 120 minutes are decided by penalties.Sort order is Championships, Runners Up, PPG, fraction of seasons qualified

Player records

Most minutes played

Most appearances, regular season only
2013–2022 seasons. 204 total matches.

Goals 
 First NWSL goal: Renae Cuellar for FC Kansas City against Portland Thorns FC, 3rd minute (13 April 2013)
 Fastest goal: Raquel Rodríguez for Sky Blue FC against Portland Thorns FC, 24 seconds (17 June 2017)
 Most goals in a regular season (24 games): 18, Sam Kerr (2019)
 Most goals in a regular season by a rookie: 11, Diana Ordonez (2022, 22-game season)
 Most goals in a game: 4, Sam Kerr (19 August 2017); Kristen Hamilton (5 July 2019); Alex Morgan (7 May 2022)
 Most goals in a half: 4, Sam Kerr (19 August 2017)
 Most hat-tricks in a season: 2, Sam Kerr (2017); Kristen Hamilton (2019)
 Most consecutive seasons to score at least 10 goals: 3
Sam Kerr, 2017–2019 (with Sky Blue FC, Chicago Red Stars)
Most consecutive seasons to score at least 15 goals: 3
Sam Kerr, 2017–2019 (with Sky Blue FC, Chicago Red Stars)
 Most different clubs to score for: 6
Jessica McDonald for Seattle Reign FC, Portland Thorns FC, Houston Dash, Western New York Flash, North Carolina Courage, and Racing Louisville FC
Youngest player to score: Olivia Moultrie, 16 years and 268 days (12 June 2022, for Portland Thorns FC against Houston Dash)

Top scorers

Goals, regular season only

Leading goalscorers in playoffs

NWSL top goalscorers by season (regular season only)

Assists
 Most assists in a season: 10, Tobin Heath, Portland Thorns FC (2016)
 Most assists in a single match: 4, Nahomi Kawasumi (for Seattle Reign FC v. Washington Spirit, 16 May 2017)

Most assists

Top assists by season

*Joint record

Goalkeepers

Clean sheets

Saves

Match records 
As of October 2, 2022

See also 
 NWSL Shield
 NWSL awards
 List of NWSL drafts
 List of NWSL hat-tricks
 Women's soccer in the United States

References

External links
 National Women's Soccer League

Records and statistics
All-time football league tables
Women's association football records and statistics
Records and statistics
Lists of women's association football players
Association football player non-biographical articles